Criggion is a village in Powys, Wales. Criggion Radio Station was located nearby.  A branch of the now defunct Shropshire and Montgomeryshire Railway terminated at Criggion.

St Michael and All Angels's church was built in red brick in 1770 and a stone-built chancel added in the mid-19th century. It is a grade II* listed building.

References

External links 

Bausley with Criggion Community Council Home Page
Photos of Criggion and surrounding area on geograph.org.uk

Villages in Powys